Streptomyces flavovariabilis is a bacterium species from the genus of Streptomyces which has been isolated from soil in Tayga in Sibiria in Russia.

See also 
 List of Streptomyces species

References

External links
Type strain of Streptomyces flavovariabilis at BacDive -  the Bacterial Diversity Metadatabase

flavovariabilis
Bacteria described in 1986